The Thirteen Buddhas of Awaji Island（淡路島十三仏霊場, Awajishima jūsan butsu reijō）are a group of 13 Buddhist sacred sites on Awaji Island in Hyōgo Prefecture, Japan, in the eastern part of the Seto Inland Sea between the islands of Honshū and Shikoku. They are dedicated to the Thirteen Buddhas.

Directory

See also
 Thirteen Buddhas

External links 

Buddhist temples in Hyōgo Prefecture
Buddhist pilgrimage sites in Japan

ja:淡路島十三仏霊場